This is a list of winners of the Sundance Film Festival Audience Award for dramatic features.

1980s
1989: sex, lies and videotape

1990s
1990: Longtime Companion
1991: One Cup of Coffee
1992: The Waterdance
1993: El Mariachi
1994: Spanking the Monkey
1995: Picture Bride
1996: The Spitfire Grill
1997: Love Jones
1998: Smoke Signals
1999: Three Seasons

2000s
2000: Two Family House
2001: no award
2002: Real Women Have Curves
2003: The Station Agent
2004: Maria Full of Grace
2005: Hustle & Flow
2006: Quinceañera
2007: Grace Is Gone
2008: The Wackness
2009: Precious: Based on the Novel "Push" by Sapphire

2010s
2010: happythankyoumoreplease
2011: Circumstance
2012: The Sessions
2013: Fruitvale Station
2014: Whiplash
2015: Me and Earl and the Dying Girl 
2016: The Birth of a Nation
2017: Crown Heights
2018: Burden
2019: Brittany Runs a Marathon

2020s
2020: Minari
2021: CODA
2022: Cha Cha Real Smooth

References

Awards established in 1989
Sundance Film Festival